Cylindrocopturinus is a genus of true weevils in the beetle family Curculionidae. There are at least four described species in Cylindrocopturinus.

Species
These four species belong to the genus Cylindrocopturinus:
 Cylindrocopturinus catherineae Anderson, 1994 c
 Cylindrocopturinus hainesi Hespenheide, 1984 c
 Cylindrocopturinus pictus (Schaeffer, 1908) i c b
 Cylindrocopturinus vanessae Anderson, 1994 c
Data sources: i = ITIS, c = Catalogue of Life, g = GBIF, b = Bugguide.net

References

Further reading

 
 
 

Curculionidae
Articles created by Qbugbot